The 2010 United States House of Representatives elections in New Jersey were held on November 4, 2010, to elect the 13 U.S. representatives from the state of New Jersey, one from each of the state's 13 congressional districts. The primary election in which candidates were chosen took place on June 8, 2010.  

As of the 2022 House elections, this is the most recent time Republicans won the popular vote for the House in New Jersey.

Overview

Match-up summary

Overview

District 1
Democrat Rob Andrews has been in congress since 1991. He won re-election in 2008 with 72%. His 2010 Republican opponent is Dale Glading. CQ Politics rates this election as Safe Democrat.

District 2 
Republican Frank LoBiondo has been in congress since 1994. He won re-election in 2008 with 59%. His 2010 Democratic opponent is Gary Stein. CQ Politics rates this election as Safe Republican.

District 3 
Democratic incumbent John Adler is running for reelection, challenged by Republican nominee Jon Runyan, NJ Tea Party nominee Peter DeStefano, Libertarian nominee Russ Conger, and Your Country Again nominee Lawrence J. Donahue.

Retired NFL player Jon Runyan was a star offensive lineman who played most of his career with the nearby Philadelphia Eagles (the Southern Jersey district is a suburb of Philadelphia). In May he took the unusual step of revealing some controversial information about himself: that he was late to pay some taxes and was sued in some business dealings. He says he is "a different type of candidate" by acknowledging his mistakes. With $1.7 million in Adler's campaign account back in April, he has a major cash advantage. CQ Politics rates this election as Lean Democrat. Cook rates the district at R+1.

On October 8, 2010, CourierPostOnline.com reported that Steve Ayscue, the paid head of operations for the Camden County Democratic Committee (CCDC), and Geoff Mackler, sent by the Democratic Congressional Campaign Committee to manage John Adler's campaign, devised a plan to put a candidate on the ballot to divert votes from Republican Jon Runyan.  They presented the plan at CCDC Headquarters during a May 26 meeting of the South Jersey Young Democrats, and some of those present joined in circulating a petition to place Peter DeStefano, owner-operator of a picture-framing business, on the ballot.  DeStefano will appear on the "NJ Tea Party" line on the November 2 ballot.  The article reports, "A Democratic operative with knowledge of the Adler campaign's operation said Ayscue is in charge of the campaign website, Facebook and Twitter accounts promoting the DeStefano campaign."

In 2008, State Senator John Adler defeated Chris Myers, a town councilman, with 52% of the vote, while Obama carried the district with the same amount.

Adler died on April 4, 2011, four months after his defeat.

Polling

†Internal poll for Adler campaign

District 4 
Republican Chris Smith has been in congress since 1980. In 2008, he won re-election with 66%. His 2010 Democratic opponent is Howard Kleinhendler. CQ Politics rates this election as Safe Republican.

District 5 
Republican Scott Garrett has been in Congress since 2002. In 2008, he won re-election with 56% of the vote. His 2010 Democratic opponent was Tod Thiese. Ed Fanning was the Green Party Candidate. CQ Politics rated this election as Safe Republican.

District 6 
Democrat Frank Pallone has been in congress since 1988. In 2008, he won re-election with 67%. His 2010 Republican opponent is Anna Little, the Mayor of Highlands. CQ Politics rates this election as Safe Democrat.

District 7 
Republican Leonard Lance is a Freshman. In 2008, State Senator and Minority Leader Lance defeated Assemblywoman Linda Stender with 50%.  The Democratic challenger is former high school science teacher Ed Potosnak, who if elected would be the first openly gay member of New Jersey's congressional delegation. Despite the bare majority received by Lance in the 2008 election, CQ Politics rates this election as Safe Republican.

District 8 
Democrat Bill Pascrell has been in congress since 1996. In 2008, he won re-election with 71%. His 2010 Republican opponent is Roland Straten. CQ Politics rates this election as Safe Democrat.

District 9 
Democrat Steve Rothman has been in congress since 1996. In 2008, he won re-election with 68%. His 2010 Republican opponent is Michael Agosta. CQ Politics rates this election as Safe Democrat.

District 10 
Democrat Don Payne has been in congress since 1988. In 2008, he won re-election unopposed. His 2010 Republican opponent is Michael Alonso. CQ Politics rates this election as Safe Democrat.

District 11 
Republican Rodney Frelinghuysen has been in congress since 1994. In 2008, he won re-election with 62%. His 2010 Democratic opponent is Army veteran and attorney Douglas Herbert. CQ Politics rates this election as Safe Republican.

District 12 
Democratic incumbent Rush Holt is running for reelection, challenged by Republican nominee businessman Scott Sipprelle and Truth, Vision, Hope nominee Kenneth J. Cody.

Holt has represented the district since 1998. In 2008, he won re-election with 63%. CQ Politics rates this election as Safe Democrat, Cook Political Report rates it Likely Democrat, and Real Clear Politics rates it as Lean Democrat.

Polling

District 13 
Democrat Albio Sires has been in congress since 2006. In 2008, he won re-election with 75%. His 2010 Republican opponent is Henrietta Dwyer. CQ Politics rates this election as Safe Democrat.

References

External links
Division of Elections at the New Jersey Secretary of State
Official candidate list
U.S. Congress candidates for New Jersey at Project Vote Smart
New Jersey U.S. House from OurCampaigns.com
Campaign contributions for U.S. Congressional races in New Jersey from OpenSecrets
2010 New Jersey General Election graph of multiple polls from Pollster.com

House - New Jersey from the Cook Political Report

2010 New Jersey elections
New Jersey
2010